i2i is a submarine telecommunications cable connecting Chennai, India and Tuas, Singapore. It was completed in April 2002 and is fully owned by Bharti Airtel after Singtel divested its interest in 2007.

The cable consists of 8 fiber pairs with a full capacity of 8.4 Tbit/s. The cable is connected with a terrestrial link between Chennai and Mumbai. It also connects with C2C Cable network, SEA-ME-WE 3 and Asia Pacific Cable Network.

Notes

Submarine communications cables in the Indian Ocean
India–Singapore relations
Bharti Airtel
2002 establishments in India
2002 establishments in Singapore
2002 establishments in Tamil Nadu
Telecommunications in India